Magnus Uggla Band sjunger schlagers is a 1979 EP from Swedish pop and rock group Magnus Uggla Band. It was released in March 1979 and  all songs, except Johnny the Rucker, are covers.

Track listing
 Johnny the Rucker
 Leva livet
 Ring ring
 Mälarö kyrka

References

External links

1979 EPs
EPs by Swedish artists
Magnus Uggla EPs